Kolga is a small borough in Kuusalu Parish, Harju County, in northern Estonia, on the territory of Lahemaa National Park. It has a population of 490.

Kolga is best known for its classicist manor.

Wrestler Aleksander Aberg (1881–1920) was born in Kolga Manor.

References

External links
Kuusalu Parish

Boroughs and small boroughs in Estonia
Kreis Harrien